Mariya Vyachaslavauna Shcherba (born 14 April 1985) is a Belarusian swimmer. She competed in the 4×100 m freestyle relay at the 2004 Summer Olympics, but her team did not reach the finals.

Her elder sister is the Olympic swimmer Hanna Shcherba. Soon after Hanna moved to France in 2001, Mariya followed her there and competed for the club CS Clichy 92.

References

1985 births
Living people
Swimmers at the 2004 Summer Olympics
Belarusian female freestyle swimmers
Olympic swimmers of Belarus
People from Baranavichy
Sportspeople from Brest Region